London (Pioneer Airpark) Aerodrome  is located  north northeast of London, Ontario, Canada.

See also
 List of airports in the London, Ontario area

References

Registered aerodromes in Ontario
Transport in London, Ontario